Hibiscus escobariae is a species of flowering plant in the family Malvaceae. It is found only in Ecuador. Its natural habitat is subtropical or tropical dry forests.

References

escobariae
Endemic flora of Ecuador
Near threatened plants
Taxonomy articles created by Polbot